Weishan Liu (劉維姍) is a guzheng (Chinese zither) master performer, composer and educator, based in San Francisco, California, United States. She studied at the Shenyang Conservatory of Music from 1949 onwards.

References

External links 
 Weishan Liu's Web page
 San Francisco Gu-Zheng Music Society

People's Republic of China composers
Guzheng players
Year of birth missing (living people)
Musicians from California
Living people
Place of birth missing (living people)